Debenham Leisure Centre Football Club is a football club based in the village of Debenham, in Suffolk, England.

History
The club was founded as Debenham Angels in 1991 and joined Division Seven of the Suffolk & Ipswich League. After an unbeaten first season, they won the division and were promoted to Division Six. In 1993–94 they were promoted again to Division Five. They were renamed AFC Debenham in 1994. They were promoted to Division Four at the end of the 1995–96 season. The club won Division Four at the first attempt, and were promoted to Division Three, which they won in 1999–2000.

In 2000–01 they were promoted to Division One. However, after missing out on promotion to the Senior Division in 2001–02, the following season they narrowly avoided being relegated back to Division Two in 2002–03. After Mel Aldis was appointed manager in the summer of 2003, the club won Division One in 2003–04 to earn promotion to the Senior Division. The title was claimed following a 10–0 win against Ipswich Exiles to overtake Framlingham Town on goal difference.

In their first season in the Senior Division Debenham finished runners-up to East Bergholt United, and were promoted to Division One of the Eastern Counties League. Upon moving up the club adopted their current name. In 2008-09 they were promoted to the Premier Division, after winning 7–0 at March Town United on the final day of the season to pip Halstead Town to third place on goal difference, having needed to win by three goals and hope Halstead failed to win (they drew 1–1 with Great Yarmouth Town). They were relegated back to Division One after finishing bottom of the Premier Division in 2010-11.

In 2013–14 the club won the Division One Knockout Cup, beating Whitton United 2–0 in the final.

Honours
Eastern Counties League
Division One Knockout Cup winners 2013–14
Suffolk & Ipswich League
Division One champions 2003–04
Division Three champions 1999–2000
Division Four champions 1996–97
Division Seven champions 1991–92

Records
Best FA Cup performance: Second qualifying round, 2007–08
Best FA Vase performance: Second round, 2008–09
Record attendance: 1,026 vs AFC Wimbledon, FA Cup second qualifying round, 29 September 2007
Most appearances: Steve Nelson
Most goals: Lee Briggs

References

External links
Official website

Football clubs in England
Football clubs in Suffolk
Association football clubs established in 1991
1991 establishments in England
Suffolk and Ipswich Football League
Eastern Counties Football League